Streets of Laredo is a 1949 American Western film directed by Leslie Fenton and starring William Holden, Macdonald Carey and William Bendix as three outlaws who rescue a young girl, played by Mona Freeman. When they become separated, two reluctantly become Texas Rangers, while the third continues on a life of crime.

The film is a Technicolor remake of King Vidor's black-and-white film The Texas Rangers (1936), which starred Fred MacMurray in Holden's role, Jack Oakie in William Bendix's, Lloyd Nolan in MacDonald Carey's role, and Jean Parker as the girl they rescue.

Plot

A trio of outlaws, Jim Dawkins (Holden), Lorn Reming (Carey), and Reuben "Wahoo" Jones (Bendix), rob a stage. But when a young lady, Rannie Carter (Freeman), is menaced by rich and ruthless Charley Calico (Alfonso Bedoya) after her uncle is killed, the robbers come to her rescue. They run him off, then pay old Pop Lint (Clem Bevans) to watch over her at his ranch.

Lorn ends up separated from his partners but continues his life of crime. Jim and Wahoo inadvertently aid some Texas Rangers and are sworn in as Rangers themselves. Lorn sees an opportunity, steals a herd of cattle the Rangers are guarding, then lets Jim and Wahoo enhance their reputation by being the ones who bring the cattle back.

Lorn's friends turn a blind eye to his activities for a while. Calico is a worse villain, burning Pop's barn and causing the old man to have a fatal heart attack. Calico assaults a Ranger as well, and is ultimately killed by Jim.

But it doesn't end there. Lorn now wants Calico's empire for himself. He also wants Rannie, who has grown to be a beautiful woman. Jim, who loves her, calls off the agreement to look the other way at Loren's misdeeds. But he does remove a bullet when a wounded Lorn hides out at Rannie's after a holdup.

Jim resigns as a lawman, then vows revenge after Wahoo is gunned down. Now that Rannie can see Lorn for what he really is, she wishes Jim luck as he rides to Laredo for a showdown. The former partners face each other for the last time, then Lorn is killed by Rannie.

Cast
 William Holden as Jim Dawkins
 Macdonald Carey as Lorn Reming
 Mona Freeman as Rannie Carter
 William Bendix as Wahoo Jones
 Stanley Ridges as Major Bailey
 Alfonso Bedoya as Charley Calico
 Ray Teal as Cantrell
 Clem Bevans as Pop Lint
 James Bell as Ike
 Dick Foote as Pipes
 Joe Dominguez as Francisco
 Grandon Rhodes as Phil Jessup
 Perry Ivins as Mayor Towson

Inspiration
The film takes its title from the old Western ballad "The Streets of Laredo", which is frequently used as underscoring.

References

External links
 
 
 

1949 films
Films scored by Victor Young
Films set in Texas
Films directed by Leslie Fenton
1949 Western (genre) films
Paramount Pictures films
American Western (genre) films
1940s American films
1940s English-language films